Yehuda Ashlag (1885–1954) was a rabbi, Kabbalist and founder of the Ashlag dynasty.

Ashlag may also refer to:
 Ashlag (Hasidic dynasty), founded by Yehuda Ashlag

People with the surname
 Baruch Ashlag (1907–1991), rabbi, and son and successor of Yehuda Ashlag